State Route 173 (SR 173) is a state highway in Clark County, Nevada. The route provides access to downtown Boulder City from U.S. Route 95 (US 95) to the south. The route was originally part of US 95 until the highway was realigned following the completion of Interstate 11 (I-11) around Boulder City.

The entire route of SR 173 is also part of the Veterans Memorial Highway.

Route description
Proceeding northward, the highway ends at an interchange with US 93 Business.

History
SR 173 was originally part of US 95. US 95 was rerouted onto the Boulder City Bypass concurrent with I-11 upon the completion of Phase 1 on May 23, 2018, and the new state highway was designated over the old route.

Major intersections

See also

References

External links

173
173
Transportation in Clark County, Nevada
Boulder City, Nevada